The Muna-Buton macaque (Macaca ochreata brunnescens) is one of seven Sulawesi macaques in Indonesia. It is only found on two small islands off the south-east coast: the islands of Buton and Muna. This Old World monkey is diurnal and arboreal, although it can spend significant amounts of time on the ground. It is black with grey "boots" and a brownish colour to the fur on its back. Like other Sulawesi macaques, it has a reduced tail of only about 35mm in length. Its body is about 475 - 495mm in length.

The Muna-Buton macaque feeds on fruits for over 60% of its diet, including figs and pandanus fruits. It also feeds on leaves, insects, flowers, and bark. It is a very successful crop-raider, and if there are agricultural fields nearby, it will spend up to 2 hours at a time raiding farmers crops, such as sweet potato, maize, papaya, and banana.

References

Macaca
Primates of Indonesia
Endemic fauna of Indonesia
Mammals of Sulawesi
Vulnerable fauna of Asia
Taxa named by Paul Matschie